Loretta is an unincorporated community in the town of Draper, Sawyer County, Wisconsin, United States. It was named by Edward Hines, a lumberman, in 1892 for his wife and daughter, both named Loretta.

References

Unincorporated communities in Sawyer County, Wisconsin
Unincorporated communities in Wisconsin